James C. "Duck" White (born October 26, 1953) is a former National Football League (NFL) defensive tackle who played from 1976 to 1983 for the Minnesota Vikings. He played college football at Oklahoma State University where he was their first four-year letterman in the modern era and was the Vikings' first round draft pick in the 1976 NFL Draft.

References

1953 births
Living people
Sportspeople from Hot Springs, Arkansas
Players of American football from Arkansas
American football defensive tackles
Oklahoma State Cowboys football players
Minnesota Vikings players